Stepan Bulba (b. 19 July 1950, Ombysh, Borzna Raion, Chernihiv Oblast, Ukraine) is a Ukrainian politician and military scientist.

External links 
 Stepan Bulba at the Official Ukraine Today portal

1950 births
Living people
People from Chernihiv Oblast
Ukrainian military engineers
Socialist Party of Ukraine politicians
Governors of Poltava Oblast
Fifth convocation members of the Verkhovna Rada
Fourth convocation members of the Verkhovna Rada
People of Ukraine without Kuchma